Sheila Finch (born 1935) is an American author of science fiction and fantasy. She is best known for her sequence of stories about the Guild of Xenolinguists.

Biography 

Sheila Finch was born in London, UK, 29 October 1935. She attended Bishop Otter College (now Chichester University) from 1954–56, then taught for a year (1956-1957) in a primary school in Hackney, London. Following her marriage to Clare Grill Rayner in 1957 (divorced 1980), she emigrated to the US and completed her BA in English Literature at Indiana University in 1959, followed by an MA in linguistics and medieval history in 1962. She has three daughters. From 1963-1967, when the family lived in San Luis Obispo, she taught part-time at Cuesta College and began publishing poetry. The family moved to Long Beach, California in 1967. Sheila  taught creative writing and science fiction at El Camino College,  from 1970- 2005. The family relocated for two years to Munich, Germany in the 1970s, where Sheila studied German and taught English as a second language.

She is a member of SFWA, serving as Vice-President for two years, then Chair of the Grievance Committee for five years. As Western Regional Director, during the 1980s and 1990s she organized activities for the organization aboard the Queen Mary in Long Beach Harbor. She is also a charter member of the Asilomar Writers Consortium, founded by Jerry Hannah in Monterey, California in 1976.

Besides teaching and publishing, Sheila has been active in the community, serving first as a volunteer in a residential hospice, then for ten years as a volunteer for St Luke’s Episcopal Church’s program for the homeless. She also served for eight years on the City of Long Beach Mayor’s Advisory Committee for Homelessness.

Sheila Finch currently lives in Long Beach, California.

Xenolinguists 

In her 1986  book Triad, Finch used the term "xenolinguist" to describe the linguists who decode alien languages.  The word has gained widespread acceptance in the science fiction industry and was used to describe the character Uhura in the remake of Star Trek.

Finch created a series of tales about communicating with aliens which eventually was consolidated in collection of short stories entitled The Guild of Xenolinguists (Golden Gryphon Press, 2007). The Guild was founded on Earth in the middle of the 22nd century after first contact with a race from somewhere in the Orion Arm of the Milky Way Galaxy. A few early linguists, neurolinguists, ethnographers and computer scientists established the Guild which then took over the responsibility for training xenolinguists to make first contact and to record alien languages in the field. Later, the Guild provided translation services for the expanding commerce and colonization of the following centuries.

Bibliography

I. Novels

II. Collections

III. Short Stories

VI. Articles & Non-Fiction

V. Poetry

Awards 
 "Reading the Bones" (1998)  Nebula novella award winner
 Tiger in the Sky (1999)  Winner of the San Diego Book Award for Best Juvenile Fiction
 Infinity's Web (1985) Winner of the Compton Crook Award for Best First Novel

Notes

External links
 Official website
 The author's blog site

1935 births
Living people
20th-century American novelists
20th-century American short story writers
20th-century American women writers
21st-century American novelists
21st-century American short story writers
21st-century American women writers
American science fiction writers
American women novelists
American women short story writers
Asimov's Science Fiction people
English emigrants to the United States
Indiana University alumni
The Magazine of Fantasy & Science Fiction people
Nebula Award winners
Women science fiction and fantasy writers
Writers from London
Writers from Long Beach, California